Xaldan (also, Khaldan and Kholdan) is a village and municipality in the Yevlakh Rayon of Azerbaijan. It has a population of 3,818. The municipality consists of the villages of Xaldan, Yuxarı Salamabad, and Quşçu.

References 
Notes

Bibliography

Populated places in Yevlakh District